Khoryatino is a rural locality (a village) in Klyazminskoye Rural Settlement, Kovrovsky District, Vladimir Oblast, Russia. The population was 10 as of 2010.

Geography 
Khoryatino is located 21 km east of Kovrov (the district's administrative centre) by road. Chentsy is the nearest rural locality.

References 

Rural localities in Kovrovsky District